William Desmond (died 5 September 1941) was an Irish Cumann na nGaedheal and later Fine Gael politician. A hotel proprietor, he was first elected to Dáil Éireann at the 1932 general election as a Cumann na nGaedheal Teachta Dála (TD) for the Cork Borough constituency, where his party colleague W. T. Cosgrave (the President of the Executive Council) topped the poll.

He was re-elected at the 1933 election, but lost his seat at the 1937 general election, when the constituency was reduced from 5 seats to 4. He then retired from politics.

Desmond was Lord Mayor of Cork from 1940 to 1941.

References

External links
List of Lord Mayors of Cork

 

Year of birth missing
1941 deaths
Cumann na nGaedheal TDs
Fine Gael TDs
Members of the 7th Dáil
Members of the 8th Dáil
Local councillors in Cork (city)
Lord Mayors of Cork